Zərqava (also, Zargova) is a village and municipality in the Quba Rayon of Azerbaijan.  It has a population of 1,418.  The municipality consists of the villages of Zərqava and Xaspolad.

References 
Tat people
Tat language

Populated places in Quba District (Azerbaijan)